Hubble Creek may refer to:

Hubble Creek (Castor River Diversion Channel tributary), a stream in Missouri
Hubble Creek (St. Francis River tributary), a stream in Missouri

See also
 Hobble Creek (disambiguation)